Yeongseo is the western, inland region of Gangwon Province, South Korea and Kangwon Province, North Korea.  It is divided from the coastal Yeongdong region by the Taebaek Mountains.  The name yeongseo reflects this distinction; it literally means “west of the passes”.  The region is marked by high plateaus and mountains, with deep valleys.  The Han and Nakdong Rivers both have their headwaters in this region.  Agriculture in Yeongseo was traditionally carried out by slash-and-burn methods, but in modern times this has largely been replaced by other techniques, including high-altitude shiitake farming.

See also
Geography of South Korea
Geography of North Korea
Korean Peninsula

External links
Gangwon Province profile of Yeongseo and Yeongdong

Regions of Korea